The Bruttians (alternative spelling, Brettii) were an ancient Italic people. They inhabited the southern extremity of Italy, from the frontiers of Lucania to the Sicilian Straits and the promontory of Leucopetra. This roughly corresponds to the modern region of Calabria.

Occupying the mountains and hills of Calabria, they were the southernmost branch of the Osco-Umbrian Italic tribes, and were ultimately descended from the Samnites through the process of Ver Sacrum. 

They are remembered as pillagers and conquerors of the Calabrian-Greek poleis and brave rebels of the Romans who never fully opposed at its military campaign.

Name 

The name is Indo-European. It is similar to Illyrian ethnonym Brentii from *brentos (deer). A close variant is attested in the name of the Bruttii in ancient Greek and the name of the community on its coinage (ΒΡΕΤΤΙΩΝ, "of the Brettioi"). Before gaining their independence from the Lucanians, the Bruttii belonged to the lower social strata of Lucanian territory. After 356 BCE when the Bruttii became independent , for the Lucanians and the ancient sources of the period the name of the Bruttii became synonyms with "rebels" and "fugitive slaves".

History

Diodorus Siculus (1st century BC) writes that the Bruttii were formed around the year 356 BC, when people of varied origins assembled in Lucania and formed this new community. These groups who are described as mostly fugitive slaves by Diodorus were considered to be "experts in affairs of war". Strabo describes the Bruttii as slave-shepherds of the Lucani who revolted. In these stories, because of their social conditions the name of the Bruttii acquired the meaning of "rebels" or "fugitive slaves". Justin wrote that the Bruttian community was formed when 500 youths from the Lucani joined the shepherds who lived in the forests and together fought against Italiote mercenaries. In this literary construction, they were helped by a woman named Bruttia and the new community according to the myth took as its name that of Bruttia. These myths which despite their different narratives place the foundation of the Bruttian community in the 4th century BC, actually postdate by several centuries the first archaeological-historical piece of evidence for the existence of the ethnonym of the Bruttii. The inscription "Bruties esum" (I am of Brutius) has been found on pottery in southern Campania already in the mid 6th century BCE. The Bruttii spoke a variant of Oscan and Illyrian settlement in older periods provided considerable Illyrian elements.

The Italic tribal wanderings of the early Roman Republic might be compared to those of the Germanic tribes during their great migration period.  Earlier tribes affiliated together and folded into new umbrella groups, which gave their names to regions, for example, the Saxons and Saxony.  Thus Livy uses the term Bruttii provincia to designate then what is now modern Calabria. The Greeks used  for the name of the country, reserving  for that of the people. Polybius, in more than one passage, calls it , likely corresponding to the natives' name for their land, "Brettiōn".

The land of the Bruttii was bounded on the north by Lucania, from which it was separated by a line drawn from the river Laus near the Tyrrhenian Sea to the Crathis near the Gulf of Tarentum. On the west it was washed by the Tyrrhenian Sea, and on the south and east by that known in ancient times as the Sicilian Sea, including under that appellation the Gulf of Tarentum.
  As noted above, this corresponds quite approximately to modern Calabria, which was named as such only during Byzantine times.

The country occupied by them was inhabited, in the earliest times described by ancient historians, by the Oenotrians a native Italic tribe whose name refers to winemaking, of which the Conii and Morgetes appear to have been subordinate divisions. It was while the Oenotrians were still masters of the land that the first Greek trading outposts were founded; and the beauty of the climate and country, as well as the rapid prosperity attained by these first settlements, proved so attractive that within a few years many Greek colonies appeared.

Such appears to have been the state of things at the time of the Peloponnesian War; but in the course of the following century a great change took place. The Lucanians (an Oscan people), who had been gradually extending their conquests towards the south, and had already made themselves masters of the northern parts of Oenotria, now pressed forwards into the Bruttian peninsula, and established their dominion over the interior of that country and many of the Greek outposts. This probably took place after their great victory over the Thurians, near Laus, in 390 BC; and little more than 30 years elapsed between this event and the rise of the people, properly called Bruttii. These are represented by some ancient authors as a congregation of rebellious natives. Justin  describes them as headed by youths of Lucanian origin, and there appears sufficient evidence of their close connection with the Lucanians to warrant the assumption that these formed an important ingredient in their national composition, together with other predecessor Italic tribes from the area, not just the Oenotrians, but also the Ausones, Mamertines, Italy, and Sicels.

The rise of the Bruttii is dated to approximately 356 BC; and this accords with the statement of Strabo that they arose at the period of the expedition of Dion against Dionysius the Younger. The wars of the latter, as well as of his father, with the Greek cities in southern Italy, and the state of confusion and weakness to which these were reduced in consequence, probably contributed in a great degree to pave the way for the rise of the Bruttian power. The name must indeed have been much more ancient, since Diodorus, in another passage, speaks of the Bruttians as having expelled the remainder of the Sybarites, who had settled Sybaris on the Traeis after the destruction of their own city. Stephanus of Byzantium, indeed, cites Antiochus of Syracuse, as using the name of Brettia for this part of Italy.

The progress of the latter, after their first appearance in history, was rapid. They quickly became numerous and powerful enough to defy the arms of the Lucanians, and not only maintained their independence in the mountain districts of the interior, but attacked and made themselves masters of the Greek cities of Hipponium, Terina, and Thurii. Their independence seems to have been readily acknowledged by the Lucanians; and less than 30 years after their first revolt, the two nations united their arms as allies against their Greek neighbors. The latter applied for assistance to Alexander, king of Epirus, who crossed over into Italy with an army, and carried on the war for several successive campaigns, during which he reduced Heraclea, Consentia (modern Cosenza), and Terina; but finally perished in a battle against the combined forces of the Lucanians and Bruttii, near Pandosia, 326 BC.

They next had to contend against the arms of Agathocles, who ravaged their coasts with his fleets, took the city of Hipponium, which he converted into a strong fortress and naval station, and compelled the Bruttians to conclude a disadvantageous peace. But they soon broke this treaty; and recovered possession of Hipponium. This appears to have been the period when the Bruttian nation had reached its highest pitch of power and prosperity; it was not long before they had to contend with a more formidable adversary, and as early as 282 BC they joined and the Lucanians and Samnites against the growing power of Rome. A few years later they are mentioned as sending auxiliaries to the army of Pyrrhus; but after the defeat of that monarch, and his expulsion from Italy, they had to bear the full brunt of the war, and after repeated campaigns and successive triumphs of the Roman generals, Gaius Fabricius Luscinus and Lucius Papirius, they were finally reduced to submission, and compelled to purchase peace by the surrender of one-half of the great forest of Sila, so valuable for its pitch and timber.

Their submission however was still but imperfect; and though they remained tranquil throughout the First Punic War, the invasion of Hannibal in the Second proved difficult for the region, and some Bruttian cities supported the Carthaginian general after the Battle of Cannae.  Rhegium (modern Reggio Calabria remained firm, and was able to defy the Carthaginian arms throughout the war. In 215 BC, Hanno, the lieutenant of Hannibal, after his defeat at Grumentum by Tiberius Gracchus, threw himself into Bruttium, where he was soon after joined by a body of fresh troops from Carthage under Bomilcar: and from this time he made that region his stronghold, from whence he repeatedly issued to oppose the Roman generals in Lucania and Samnium, while he constantly fell back upon it as a place of safety when defeated or hard pressed by the enemy. The physical character of the country rendered it necessarily a military position of the greatest strength: and after the defeat and death of Hasdrubal Hannibal himself put forces into some Bruttian territory, where he continued to maintain his ground against the Roman generals. There is very little information concerning the operations of the four years during which Hannibal retained his positions in this province: he appears to have made his headquarters for the most part in the neighbourhood of Crotona, but the name of Castra Hannibalis retained by a small town on the Gulf of Squillace, points to his having occupied this also as a permanent station. Meanwhile, the Romans, though avoiding any decisive engagement, were continually gaining ground on him by the successive reduction of towns and fortresses, so that very few of these remained in the hands of the Carthaginian general when he was finally recalled from Italy.

The ravages of so many successive campaigns inflicted a severe blow upon the prosperity of Bruttium: the measures adopted by the Romans to punish them completed their romanization. They were deprived of a great part of their territory, It was however some time before they were altogether crushed: for several years after the close of the Second Punic War, one of the praetors was annually sent with an army to watch over the Bruttians: and it was evidently with the view of more fully securing their subjection that three colonies of Roman veteran soldiers and their families were established in their territory, two of Roman citizens at Tempsa and Crotona, and a third with Latin rights at Hipponium, to which the name of Vibo Valentia was now given. A fourth was at the same time settled at Thurii on their immediate frontier.  Among the settlers at the latter were some ancestors of the first Roman Emperor, Caesar Augustus.

So complete was the romanization of the region, that the Bruttians as a people are not mentioned separately except for a few exceptions.  First, their country again became the theatre of war during the revolt of Spartacus, who after his first defeats by Crassus, took refuge in the southernmost portion of Bruttium (called by Plutarch the Rhegian peninsula), in which the Roman general sought to confine him by drawing lines of intrenchment across the isthmus from sea to sea. The insurgent leader however forced his way through, and again carried the war into the heart of Lucania.

Next, during the Civil Wars the coasts of Bruttium were repeatedly laid waste by the fleets of Sextus Pompeius, and witnessed several conflicts between the latter and those of Octavian, who had established the headquarters both of his army and navy at Vibo. Strabo speaks of the whole province as reduced in his time to a state of complete decay.

It was included by Augustus in the Third Region (Regio III), together with Lucania; and the two provinces appear to have continued united for most administrative purposes until the fall of the Roman Empire, and were governed conjointly by a magistrate termed a Corrector. The Liber Coloniarum however treats of the Provincia Bruttiorum as distinct from that of Lucania.  Still, by the fifth century decline of the Western Empire, the region of Brettiōn was recorded as requesting help from the Roman Emperor from pirate raids on the coast, something that for years was recorded in error as occurring in Britain as the Groans of the Britons, due to similarity of the names. 

The Bruttians were never fully conquered and were always the ones who rebelled the most to the Roman Empire.

The Bruttian Military System

Bruttian Warriors and Highground Defences 
The Bruttians inherit the style of the Armor (Greeks and Saminites) and the use of the Javel (Greeks) in fact the Bruttians' elitè warriors were the Javel Throwers(in the Pandosia Battle Alexander 1st of Epirus was killed by one of those). During times of peace and war they usually built outposts and fortresses on the hills and / or in excavations in the tuff

Roman gentes of Bruttian origin 
 Bruttia gens

Romans with ties to Brettiōn 

The family of the emperor Augustus had ties to the Roman colony at Thurii, such that Mark Antony accused him of having Brettian blood.  Cicero had a villa at Vibo Valentia, and praised Reggio Calabria as being one of the ten most beautiful cities in the world.

See also
List of ancient Italic peoples

References

Sources

Osci
Tribes conquered by Rome